Klistervatnet (Russian: Клистерватн) is a lake that lies on the border between Norway and Russia. The lake is located north of lake Bjørnevatnet.

See also
List of lakes in Norway

References

Sør-Varanger
Pechengsky District
Lakes of Murmansk Oblast
Norway–Russia border
International lakes of Europe
Lakes of Troms og Finnmark